Turkuaz Airlines was a charter airline based in Ankara, Turkey. It declared bankruptcy in 2010.

Operations
Turkuaz Airlines operated an extensive programme of charter flights on behalf of various tour operators. They also supplied aircraft for lease to other airlines.

Their international destinations were to Belgium, Denmark, United Kingdom, Israel, Germany, and the Netherlands. Their domestic destinations from Ankara were to Istanbul, Izmir, and Kayseri.

Turkish Civil Aviation Authorities (SHGM) revoked the AOC (Airline Operating Certificate) for 90 days after an inspection of the company.

Owner and CEO Hidayet Aydogan bought a franchise licence to open Turkey's first Hooters Restaurant.

On 3 March 2011,  Turkish businessman Fadil Akgündüz bought Turkuaz Airlines. The name of the company was soon to be changed.

Fleet
The Turkuaz Airlines fleet included the following aircraft (as of 4 July 2010):

As of 4 September 2010, the average age of the Turkuaz Airlines fleet was 7.7 years.

References

External links

Turkuaz Airlines
Turkuaz Airlines Fleet & Age

Defunct airlines of Turkey
Airlines established in 2006
Airlines disestablished in 2010
Defunct charter airlines of Turkey